To Hell with the Ugly is a 2010 Spanish romantic comedy film directed by Nacho G. Velilla which stars Javier Cámara and Carmen Machi in the lead roles, also featuring Hugo Silva, Julián López Ingrid Rubio, Lluís Villanueva, Tristán Ulloa, María Pujalte and Juan Diego.

Plot 
Set in the countryside, the plot concerns the love story of Eliseo, an awkward and "ugly" character, with his scorned sister-in-law, Nati.

Cast

Production 
The film was produced by Antena 3 Films and Producciones Aparte. Primarily shot in Aragon, shooting locations included Tiesas, Ansó, Hecho, Jaca, Huesca, and Zaragoza. Filming wrapped by August 2009 in Madrid. Nacho G. Velilla and Mercedes Gamero took over production duties.

Release 
Distributed by Warner Bros Pictures International España, the film was theatrically released in Spain on 23 April 2010, and it eventually broke the 1 million viewers mark. It became the third largest grossing Spanish film in 2010 in the domestic market, after Three Steps Above Heaven and Julia's Eyes.

See also 
 List of Spanish films of 2010

References 
CItations

Bibliography
 

2010s Spanish-language films
Spanish romantic comedy films
2010 romantic comedy films
Films shot in the province of Huesca
Films shot in Madrid
2010s Spanish films
Atresmedia Cine films